Judianna Makovsky (born 24 August 1955) is an American costume designer, who is perhaps best known for her work on the films Harry Potter and the Philosopher's Stone (2001), Seabiscuit (2003) and The Hunger Games (2012), as well as various films within the Marvel Cinematic Universe. As of March 2021, she has received three Academy Award nominations.

Oscar nominations

All three nominations are in the category of Best Costume Design.

71st Academy Awards-Nominated for Pleasantville. Lost to Shakespeare in Love.
74th Academy Awards-Nominated for Harry Potter and the Philosopher's Stone. Lost to Moulin Rouge!.
76th Academy Awards-Nominated for Seabiscuit. Lost to The Lord of the Rings: The Return of the King.

Selected filmography

References

External links

Living people
1967 births
American costume designers
Women costume designers
People from New Jersey